Demetrida grandis is a species of ground beetle in Lebiinae subfamily. It was described by Chaudoir in 1848 and is endemic to Australia.

References

Beetles described in 1848
Beetles of Australia
grandis